East Isabel/Savo was a single-member constituency of the Governing Council and Legislative Assembly of the Solomon Islands between 1973 and 1976. Covering eastern Santa Isabel Island and Savo Island, it replaced the Ngella/Savo/Russells and Santa Isabel constituencies, and was succeeded by East Isabel (in which its sole MP Francis Reginald Kikolo was re-elected) and Russells/Savo.

List of MPs

Election results

1973

References

Governing Council of the Solomon Islands constituencies
Legislative Assembly of the Solomon Islands constituencies
1973 establishments in the Solomon Islands
Constituencies established in 1973
1976 disestablishments in the Solomon Islands
Constituencies disestablished in 1976